David Peter Williams (born 18 September 1968) is an English former professional footballer who played as a goalkeeper.

He made 112 appearances in the Football League, and then played English non-league football for Stalybridge Celtic and in Wales for several clubs.

References

1968 births
Living people
Footballers from Liverpool
English footballers
Association football goalkeepers
Oldham Athletic A.F.C. players
Burnley F.C. players
Rochdale A.F.C. players
Cardiff City F.C. players
Stalybridge Celtic F.C. players
Ebbw Vale F.C. players
Bangor City F.C. players
Rhyl F.C. players
Caernarfon Town F.C. players
English Football League players